A Kiss for Susie is a lost 1917 American silent comedy film directed by Robert Thornby and written by Harvey F. Thew and Paul West. The film stars Vivian Martin, Tom Forman, John Burton, Jack Nelson, Pauline Perry, and Chris Lynton. The film was released on August 2, 1917, by Paramount Pictures.

Plot
As described in a film magazine, while the male members of the family bring home money, Susie (Martin) keeps house and tries to keep them filled with food. A wealthy uncle dies and leaves the bricklayer fifty thousand pounds of gold, so the Nolans move into better quarters and fall in with a cheap set. Susie sees the ruin that money is bringing her father, brother, and sister, and succeeds in convincing them to invest in a supposedly poor stock. The venture fails and they suppose themselves penniless until Susie's beau (Forman) returns the money which he has invested in securities to take care of the family for life.

Cast 
Vivian Martin as Susie Nolan
Tom Forman as Phil Burnham
John Burton as Peter Schwartz
Jack Nelson as Jim Noolan Jr.
Pauline Perry as Lizzie Nolan
Chris Lynton as Jim Nolan Sr.
Elinor Hancock as Mrs. Burnham

References

External links 
 

1917 films
1910s English-language films
Silent American comedy films
1917 comedy films
Paramount Pictures films
Films directed by Robert Thornby
American black-and-white films
American silent feature films
Lost American films
1917 lost films
Lost comedy films
1910s American films